Tower Psychiatric Hospital is a government-funded psychiatric hospital and psychosocial rehabilitation Centre in the Raymond Mhlaba Local Municipality area of Fort Beaufort, Eastern Cape in South Africa. It provides long-term psychiatric care and psychosocial rehabilitation services to the entire Eastern Cape. The hospital has a full-time psychiatrist since December 2015.

The hospital departments include a rehabilitation centre, pharmacy, anti-retroviral (ARV) treatment for HIV/AIDS, laundry services, and kitchen service.

In 1894 the colonial government converted the barracks at Fort Beaufort into an asylum for natives only. This asylum admitted both the mentally ill and patients with tuberculosis. It received far less funding than other asylums within the colony. Perhaps the most famous admission was made in 1922, when the prophetess Nontetha Nkwenkwe was incarcerated here.
 
Today the hospital is situated on new grounds in Fort Beaufort within the Amathole Municipality. The institution serves the entire province of the Eastern Cape, with an estimated population of 6.9 million. It provides medium-to-long-term psychiatric care (approximately 180 days) and psychosocial rehabilitation services. This is a government-funded hospital consisting of 400 beds (344 males, 56 females).

Vision and mission
The vision of the institution is to provide an effective and efficient resource to empower psychiatric patients in the province to attain maximum level of independence, optimal wellbeing and a quality of life in a just society. The mission is to aspire to be a dynamic, well equipped resource in the province, capable of developing patients' life skills and potential, through skills education and training so that patients can be independent citizens capable of managing their own affairs in a rapidly changing society.

Staff
The hospital has a chief executive officer, clinical manager and a hospital board. The multi-disciplinary team consists of nurses, a psychiatrist, two clinical psychologists, two occupational therapists and five social workers. There is an onsite pharmacy run by two full-time pharmacists. 
The administrative service consists of an onsite human resources department, finance officer and supply chain office. The grounds are maintained by the workshop staff. There is onsite laundry and kitchen services.

Services
In addition to general psychiatric care the Hospital provides psychosocial rehabilitation services. The Rehabilitation Centre is the flagship of the institution. The Centre provides an onsite adult basic education, computer literacy, piggery, carpentry, leather works, garden projects, sewing and art work. The Art Work project jointly runs an exhibition with Fort England Psychiatric Hospital at the Grahamstown National Arts Festival. The Centre is embarking on an Independent Livings Project, a move towards the provision of community psychiatric services.

Referral procedure
Patients are referred by other specialised psychiatric hospitals and mental health units from within the province. Referral forms are available from the patient administration office.

Coat of arms
The hospital registered a coat of arms at the Bureau of Heraldry in 1970: Or, a tower of Fort Beaufort proper, ensigned with an  antique lamp Azure enflamed Gules, over all a looped tau cross, Or, between two wings Azure.  The arms were designed by Ivan Mitford-Barberton and Cornelis Pama.

External links
 Tower Hospital and Rehabilitation Centre

References

Hospitals in the Eastern Cape
Psychiatric hospitals in South Africa
Raymond Mhlaba Local Municipality